Gudžiūnų Geležinkelio Stotis ('Gudžiūnai train station', formerly Michelmontas) is a train station settlement in Kėdainiai district municipality, in Kaunas County, in central Lithuania. According to the 2011 census, the settlement had a population of 34 people. It is located 2 km from Gudžiūnai, by the Mairiškiai-Gudžiūnai road and Vilnius-Šiauliai railway line.

At the 19th and the beginning of the 20th century Michelmont was a train station and an estate of 14 voloks.

Demography

Images

References

Villages in Kaunas County
Kėdainiai District Municipality